Sporveien Trikken AS, formerly Oslo Sporvognsdrift AS and Oslotrikken AS, is the company that operates the Oslo Tramway in Oslo, Norway. Sporveien Trikken is owned by Sporveien, which is again owned by the city council and has an operating contract with Ruter. The company operates 72 trams (40 SL79 and 32 SL95), has 374 employees and headquarters at Grefsen. The company was led by the former Minister of Transport, Torild Skogsholm, until March 2011.

References

Railway companies of Norway
Companies based in Oslo
Oslo Sporveier
Oslo Tramway operators